Bronwyn Carlton is an American comic book author, editor, and radio DJ.  She has written a number of DC Comics titles, including Catwoman and The Books of Faerie, as well as the Paradox Press imprint title, The Big Book of Death. 

She has worked as an editor for both DC and Marvel. At DC, she worked on both the Paradox Press and Piranha Press imprints. At Marvel, she worked on the Marvel Knights line.

In 2008, she was featured in the documentary film Guest of Cindy Sherman.

She is also a DJ for WFMU, a free-form radio station in New Jersey.  She has hosted various shows since late 1988. These include "Truck Stop Tea Party" and hosted "Sportsy Talk with Bronwyn C. & Jim the Poet."

Carlton has spoken publicly about her experience with "prosopagnosia" ("face blindness"), and is an advocate for recognition of that condition as a disability.

Personal life
Ms. Carlton attended Reed College in Portland, Oregon, where she earned a Bachelor's degree in psychology/animal behavior. She is married to illustrator Sean Taggart (since 1991).

References

External links 
 Carlton's playlist page at WFMU 91.1 fm
 Listing of Carlton's Wedding in the New York Times
 Interview with John Figueroa praising Carlton (mentioned by her married name, Taggart) as an editor on Marvel Knights 

Living people
American comics writers
American radio DJs
Year of birth missing (living people)